Crystal Anthony (born November 20, 1980) is an American female cyclo-cross cyclist. She represented her nation in the women's elite event at the 2016 UCI Cyclo-cross World Championships  in Heusden-Zolder.

References

External links
 

1980 births
Living people
Cyclo-cross cyclists
American female cyclists
21st-century American women